Vojvodina is an autonomous province in Serbia.

Vojvodina may also refer to:

In history
 Serbian Vojvodina, a Serbian autonomous region within the Austrian Empire, proclaimed during the 1848 Revolution
 Voivodeship of Serbia and Temes Banat, a voivodship (duchy) of the Austrian Empire that existed between 1849 and 1860
 Banat, Bačka and Baranja, a de facto existing province of the Kingdom of Serbia and the Kingdom of Serbs, Croats and Slovenes between October 1918 and March 1919
 Socialist Autonomous Province of Vojvodina, one of the two socialist autonomous provinces of the Socialist Republic of Serbia from 1963 to 1990
 Voivodeship, a unit of administration dating to medieval Romania, Hungary, Poland, Lithuania, Latvia, Russia and Serbia

In sport
 Vojvodina Novi Sad, a sports society (polideportivo) from Novi Sad, Serbia
 FK Vojvodina, a football club from Novi Sad, Serbia
 KK Vojvodina, a basketball club from Novi Sad, Serbia
 OK Vojvodina, a volleyball club from Novi Sad, Serbia

In politics
 Vojvodina Coalition, a political party in the Serbian province of Vojvodina
 Republic of Vojvodina, a political program of the League of Social Democrats of Vojvodina

In tourism
 Old Vojvodina hotel, a hotel on the central square in Zrenjanin, Serbia

See also
 Vojvodinci, a village in Serbia